This is the list of cathedrals in Romania sorted by denomination.

Eastern Orthodox

Romanian Orthodox
Cathedrals of the Romanian Orthodox Church:
 Coronation Cathedral in Alba Iulia
  in Alexandria
  in Arad
  in Baia Mare (under construction)
 Patriarchal Cathedral of Saints Constantine and Helen in Bucharest
 Romanian People's Salvation Cathedral in Bucharest (under construction)
 Ascension of the Lord Cathedral in Bacău 
  in Buzău
 Cathedral of Saint George in Caransebeș
 Dormition of the Theotokos Metropolitan Cathedral in Cluj-Napoca
 Cathedral of Saints Peter and Paul in Constanța
 Metropolitan Cathedral of Saint Demetrius in Craiova
 Curtea de Argeș Cathedral
 Cathedral of Saint Nicholas in Curtea de Argeș
 Nativity of the Theotokos Cathedral in Drobeta-Turnu Severin
 Resurrection of the Lord Cathedral in Fălticeni (under construction)
  in Galați
 Dormition of the Theotokos Cathedral in Giurgiu
 Hunedoara Cathedral in Hunedoara
  in Huși
 Metropolitan Cathedral in Iași
 Moon Church in Oradea
 Cathedral of Saint George in Pitești
 Cathedral of Saint Nicholas in Râmnicu Vâlcea
  in Roman
 Cathedral of Saint George in Sfântu Gheorghe
 Metropolitan Holy Trinity Cathedral in Sibiu
 Ascension of the Lord Cathedral in Slobozia
 Cathedral of Saint George in Suceava
 Cathedral of the Nativity in Suceava
 Holy Trinity Cathedral in Târgoviște
 Cathedral of Saint George in Tecuci
 Metropolitan Cathedral of the Three Holy Hierarchs in Timișoara
 Cathedral of Saint Nicholas in Tulcea
 Saint Paraschiva Cathedral in Zalău

Serbian Orthodox
Cathedrals of the Serbian Orthodox Church:
 Cathedral of the Ascension in Timișoara

Lutheran
Lutheran cathedrals in Romania:
 Biserica Neagră in Brașov
 Sibiu Lutheran Cathedral in Sibiu

Calvinist
Cathedrals of the Reformed Church in Romania:
 Reformed Church in Cluj
 Two-towered Reformed Church in Oradea

Catholic

Latin Church
Catholic cathedrals of the Latin Church:
 Saint Michael Cathedral in Alba Iulia
 Saint Joseph Cathedral in Bucharest
 Our Lady Queen of Iași Cathedral in Iași
 Saint Mary Cathedral Basilica in Oradea
 Ascension Cathedral in Satu Mare
 Saint George Cathedral in Timișoara

Romanian Greek Catholic Church
Cathedrals of the Romanian Greek Catholic Church:
 Holy Trinity Cathedral in Blaj
 Transfiguration Cathedral in Cluj-Napoca
 Descent of the Holy Spirit Cathedral in Lugoj
 Assumption of Mary Cathedral in Baia Mare 
 Saint Nicholas Cathedral in Oradea
 Saint Basil the Great Cathedral in Bucharest

Armenian Catholic
Cathedral of the Armenian Catholic Church:
 Holy Trinity Cathedral in Gherla

See also
List of cathedrals

References

 
Romania
Cathedrals
Cathedrals